Highton is a populated place situated along the border of Buckingham and Solebury townships in Bucks County, Pennsylvania, United States.

Geography
The small settlement is located along Street Road (which runs along the township line) at its intersection with Ridge Road.

There are a few houses located around the settlement; the remainder consists of farms and properties containing large houses over rolling terrain.

References

Unincorporated communities in Bucks County, Pennsylvania
Unincorporated communities in Pennsylvania